Markku Flinck (born January 4, 1985) is a Finnish professional ice hockey player. He is currently playing for Jukurit of the Finnish Liiga.

He made his Liiga debut playing with Espoo Blues during the 2004–05 SM-liiga season.

References

External links

1985 births
Living people
Finnish ice hockey centres
Espoo Blues players
SaiPa players
Ilves players
Sportspeople from Espoo